Sreevallabha Temple is a highly orthodox Hindu temple dedicated to Lord Sreevallabhan. It is one of the oldest and biggest Temples of Kerala, and has been a major destination for devotees all over India for centuries. Located in Thiruvalla city, this ocean of orthodoxy is well known for its architectural grandeur and unique customs that can be found in no other temples. There are stone-wooden carvings and mural paintings inside the temple. Being one among 108 Divya Desams, Sreevallabha temple has been glorified by Alvars and many other ancient works. It is considered to be the vallabha kshethram mentioned in Garuda Purana and Matsya Purana. Kathakali is played daily in the temple as an offering, pushing it to the top in India in terms of places where Kathakali is staged in largest number of days per year. Lord Vishnu appeared here as Sreevallabhan for sage Durvasa and Khandakarnan. Pleased by prayers of an old Brahmin lady Sreevallabhan incarnated as a brahmachari and killed the demon Thokalaasuran. Later the deity of Sreevallabhan worshipped by Lakshmi and Krishna has been installed in the temple in 59 BC. From then till date, the temple follows its own worship protocol that is known to be followed nowhere else yet. Sage Durvasa and Saptarishi are said to reach the temple every midnight for worshipping the Lord. The temple had governed one of the biggest educational institutions in ancient time and heavily contributed to the cultural and educational developments of Kerala

Access
Situated 750 meters south to Ramapuram vegetable market and 500 metres south to Kavumbhagom junction on Thiruvalla–Ambalappuzha state highway (SH-12), Sreevallabha temple is just 2.5 km away from Thiruvalla railway station and 2 km from KSRTC bus stand. Both KSRTC and private bus services are available frequently. Auto-taxi services are also available.

Temple administration
The temple is under administration of Travancore Devaswom Board and is a major temple under Thiruvalla group.

History

Present Thiruvalla was once a village among 64 Namboothiri villages in Kerala and is one among the oldest human settlements in India. Since this place is situated at the mouth (vai) of Manimala River (valla river) it had been known as ‘vallavai’ and later transforned into ‘thiruvalla’. Historical evidences point out the place had been inhabited by humans before 3000 BC. The Thiruvalla inscriptions say the temple for Sudarshana Chakra was built in 2998 BC . Another opinion is that the place was named after sreevallabha temple as sreevallabhapuram and Thiruvalla in colloquial Malayalam.  The temple for Sudarshana Chakra was built  by Sreedevi Antherjanam of Sankramangalathu Illam and it was elaborately rebuilt by Queen Cherumthevi in 59 BC. Sreevallabha temple flourished to a major spiritual and educational centre by AD 1100. The temple had governed a Vedic school (thiruvalla sala) with around 1500 students and 150 teachers. Veda, Vedanta, Tarka, Mimamsa, Jyotisha, Ayurveda, and Kalaripayattu were taught there. The temple also owned an ayurvedic hospital with facilities to admit and treat 100 patients at a time. Addressing lord Sreevallabhan by names Kolapiran, Thiruvazhmarvan and Sundarayan, the Tamil vaishnavite saints Nammalvar of the 5th century AD (2612-2622 in Divya Prabhandham) and Thirumangai Alvar of the 9th century AD (paasurams 1806-1817 in Divya prabhandham) had praised glory of the temple. Famous Sanskrit poet Daṇḍin (7th century AD) of Kanchi mentioned the temple in his works. The first ever prose work in Malayalam is the Thiruvalla inscriptions dated to the first half of the 12th century AD, which was obtained from the temple during 1915. The Unnuneeli Sandesam of the 13th century AD highlighted the grandeur, beauty, serenity, fame and status of the temple during its time. Other works that glorified the temple are Sreevallabha Ksethra Mahathmyam of the 10th century AD,  Sreevallabha Charitham kavyam, Thukalasura Vadham Kathakali, Sreevallabha Charitham Kathakali, Sreevallabha Vijayam Kathakali, Sreevallabha Suprabhatham, Sreevallabha Karnamritha Sthothram, Yajanavali Sangrham etc.

From the date built, the temple was under control of thiruvalla pattillathil pottimar (Brahmins of ten families) till 1752-1753. Sreevallabha Temple emerged out as a major spiritual destination for devotees all over India centuries before. It had 15 major priests (melsanthi) and 180 sub-ordinate priests (keezhsanthi) all the time and another 108 for only daily noon pooja. Temple provided staying and food facilities for all visitors, students, teachers etc. and also used to conduct annadanam (serving food to the poor) daily. Naivedyam of Lord Sreevallabhan for a single time used to be made from 45 para (one para can feed appx 100 persons) rice. In all these years, temple acquired enormous amount of wealth that it even used to serve food in golden banana leaves and throw them considering as the leavings. It also had thousands of acres of land too which are lost now. During 1752-1753 Marthanda Varma of Travancore captured the temple from Pathillathil Pottimar and it is believed that Ramayyan Dalawa looted whole temple assets to Thiruvananthapuram. Up to 1968, ladies and elephants were not allowed in the temple. The temple used to be opened for ladies only during Thiruvathira of dhanu month and Vishu of medam till then. Anyhow now this custom is not in practise. These facts clearly say that how popular and wealthy the temple was in those days.

Architecture

Built in the silent and picturesque land on the banks of Manimala river, this icon of Kerala temple architecture, covers an area of 8.5 acres and ranks first among the temples of old Travancore state in terms of area inside the compound wall. The temple is surrounded on all sides by 12 feet, tall 566 feet long, 4.5 feet thick red granite compound walls with a two-storied gopuram (gate tower) on each side. This huge wall was built in 57 BC and is believed that it was completed in a single night by bhoothagana (servants) of The Lord. Outside eastern wall a big pond covering 1.5 acres is seen in north-eastern direction with a copper flagstaff on its southern bank. A platform for performing kathakali is seen just in front of the eastern entrance. Inside the wall pradakshina veethi or outer circumambulation path is seen with four small aankottils (places where the deity is taken out and kept for worship inside temple wall) and a big one on south-eastern corner. South-east to this an oottupura or dining hall is seen which is built in all other temples only on northern side and this is unique to Sreevallabha temple only. Temple auditorium and administrative offices can be seen next to this. Smaller shrines for lord Ganapathy and Ayyappan   and another auditorium are seen in south-western side. The position of kshethra palan or temple guard which is strictly built in all temples on northern side is found here just in front of Ganapathy's shrine i.e. on southern side which also is another peculiarity found nowhere else. The sacred fig and mango trees beneath which sage Durvasa meditated is found near Ayyappan shrine. Just outside the western gopuram, Sankaramangalth Illam where Sreedevi Antharjanam lived is seen well preserved for the initiation of any pooja in the temple. Northern gopuram is closed always and is opened only for Uthra Sreebali festival. North east to pradakshina veethi, a self originated pond called Jalavanthi or Khandakarna theerthem which is believed to contain 64 hidden idols of the Lord is seen. It is for only the use of priests. Spot where sage Vedavyasa and sage Durvasa disappeared is found on its eastern bank and resting building for the priests on southern side.  North to the temple a roofless shrine dedicated to kurayappa swamy is seen. No pooja is done here, but only banana as naivedyam. The bahir bali vrutham or outer circle of sacrificial stones is built inner to bahir pradakshina veethi. The temple koothambalam (stage) was destroyed by fire in 1915.
The most highlighted construction of the temple is the Garuda dhvaja sthambam or flagstaff of Garuda, the majestic eagle mount of lord Vishnu. This monolithic structure is completely built from black granite and elevated 53.5 feet above the ground with its lower end touching water table. Constructed in 57 BC, this structure was also built in a single night along with the outer wall. And an amazing fact is that no black granites can be found in an area ten miles around the temple. A 3 feet massive idol of Garuda is placed on the top of it facing the main sanctum. Since this flagstaff started slanting and reached its current position, a three tiered copper roofed construction has been made all around it to prevent further slanting. West to this, currently used golden flagstaff can be seen.

West to the third flagstaff, balikkalpura (room of the major sacrificial stone) is built around a ten feet tall balipeetha (main sacrificial stone). Vallyambalam (building attached to naalambalam at its main entrance and between naalambalam and balikkalpura) is a double storied copper sheet roofed building standing on 16 stone pillars. These pillars and the roof are noted for their exquisite and minute carvings demonstrating the excellence of those who built it. The central corridor of vallyambalam leads to naalambalam (double walled building constructed around sanctum-sanctorum at a distance) with thidappalli or holy kitchen, navakappura or room for navaka pooja etc. The 150 feet long, 11 feet Broad square naalambalam is completely made out of black stones and supported by 54 stone pillars beautifully carved with the image of a Salabhanjika on each. Outside naalambalam, a deepasala (galaxy of bronze lamps) is built on teak wood. The western part of naalambalam is adorned with some murals and a small shrine for vadakkum thevar i.e., the idols of Vishnu, Shiva, Parvati, Murugan and Nrithaganapathy worshipped by Sreedevi Antherjanam. Two namaskara mandapam (prostration building) are built against both doors of Sreekovil (sanctum-sanctorum) and only Brahmins are allowed there. The eastern mandapam is 24 feet long square building with copper sheeted roof and stand on 12 wooden and 4 stone pillars. All these are well known for their fine carvings. The western mandapam is small and also square shaped.
The circular, copper roofed, golden domed sreekovil is adorned with finely etched murals of matsya, kaaliyamardana, kurma, Dakshinamurthy, varaha, venu gopala, maha ganapathy, narasimha, vamana, sudarshana, parashurama, sree rama, Purusha sukta, balarama, sreeKrishna, lakshmi, kalki and garuda in clockwise manner. Sreekovil has an outer perimeter of 160 feet and has three concentric walls. It enshrines Lord Sreevallabhan facing east and Sudarshana chakra(sathrusamhaaramoorthy) facing west under the same roof. Sreevallabhan is portrayed as bearing a lotus in right hand, chakra in right upper hand, sankha in left upper hand and his left hand kept on his waist (kati hastham). This 7 feet tall massive idol is situated at a height of 10 feet in such a way that one has to bend his body to see it and its top and bottom cannot be seen. Along with this idol other idols of Vishnu, Lakshmi, Dakshinamurthy, Varaha and Sreebali bimbam or procession idol of Sreevallabhan are also there.  Unlike usual yantra form, here Sudarsana is installed in eight handed human form bearing sankha (conch), chakra(disc), gada, padma(lotus), pasha(rope), ankusa (hook), musala(pole), and dhanu(bow). No other temples are known to enshrine lord Vishnu and lord Sudarsana under same roof

Legends

Legends have their own space in relation with the history of a temple, but they should never be mixed up. While going through the legends related to Sreevallabha temple it is clear that even though Sreevallabhan’s idol is older, it was the temple for sudarshana built first. These legends can be summarised as below.

Ascend of Sreevallabhan’s idol to the earth
Before creation, while being in deep meditation at the origin of universe, Viratpurusha appeared to Brahma. Brahma understood the Lord as he could and later on continued worshipping Purusha in an idol created by Vishvakarma from energy concentrated out of extreme power and vehemence of Purusha. Upon request by Samudradeva (god of water) lord Brahma advised worship protocol of Purusha to him and handed over the idol. Later goddess Adi Parashakti takes birth as Samudradeva's daughter in the name Sreedevi (lakshmi,shree). Sreedevi worshipped the very same idol and lord Vishnu promised to marry her while she comes out during churning of the milky ocean in Satya Yuga. This eventually made Vishnu to be known as sreevallabhan (sree-lakshmi, vallabhan-husband) and the goddess incorporated her power also to the idol. Later Vishnu married Lakshmi as he promised.

Tapasya of sage Durvasa
After the churning of milky ocean, sage Durvasa was upset due his own wrathful nature which led to the whole incidents. He sought advice of his father, lord Shiva who directed Durvasa to lord Brahma for getting the knowledge of Parabrahmam. Brahma advised the same as he did to Samudradeva and asked him to worship the Lord. Durvasa along with 63 disciples reached the Earth and found a suitable place and named it as Mallikavanam (forest of jasmines). Durvasa did tapas beneath jointly growing mango and sacred fig.Later in Treta Yuga, the Lord appeared to the sage. As lord Vishnu appeared, water sprouts rushed out of earth and Durvasa washed the Lord's feet with it. Pleased with the sage's devotion, Vishnu promised to be present at the spot forever on a condition that the sage should do his service whenever he appear in a form that can be visualized by all. (The spot where Durvasa meditated is south-west to the temple and the water sprouts turned into a tank, Jalavanthy).

Khandakarnan and his bells
In spite of being son of lord Shiva, Khandakarnan was a horrible ogre who used to sacrifice animals to please Shiva and never missed any chance to humiliate Vishnu. He had a pair of bells as ear rings so that he can hear only the name of Shiva what he used to chant always. As he didn't get salvation even after long time, he asked Shiva for its reason. Shiva decided to teach him both Shiva and Vishnu are same advised him to worship Vishnu. Directed by Durvasa, Khandakarnan reaches Mallikavanam. There he took bath in Jalavanthy and threw away his ear rings and got a new pair so that he can hear only the name of Vishnu thereafter. During Dvapara Yuga, Vishnu appeared in front of him as Sreevallabhan and he got salvation. By this, Jalavanthy became famous by the name Khandakarna Theerthem.

Journey of Sreevallabhan’s idol
Soon after the construction of Dvaraka, Samudradeva gifted many precious things including Sreevallabhan's idol to Krishna. Krishna handed it over to his friend Satyaki saying “there is nothing in the world for Vishnu pooja like Sreevallabhan’s idol. Worshipping Vishnu directly and worshipping this idol are the same always. It has got the power to wash away even sins accumulated through ages”. Satyaki asked Krishna's permission for building a temple and celestial architect Vishvakarma constructed the biggest temple in Dvārakā. Sage Vedavyasa installed the idol and Durvasa advised worship protocol. During the end of Dvapara Yuga, Sathyaki handed over the idol to Garuda and asked to keep it safe for the use of humans in Kali Yuga. Garuda went to Ramanaka island and worshipped it there. Worship of the idol made Garuda free from all his curses. When the time for Garuda to leave the earth reached, he had hidden the idol in the Bhadra deep of Netravati River (in present-day Dakshina kannada dist., Karnataka)

Annihilation of Thokalasuran

Brahmins are envious
Mallikavanam became a human settlement before thousands of years and emerged out as a high-profile spiritual and educational centre with enormous wealth and human power. At that time only Brahmin families were not less than 3000 and Sankaramangalath illam enjoyed top status among them. But Sankaramangalath Illam faced risk of extinction as only an old lady and her younger son Narayana Bhattathiri lived there. Bhattathiri married Sreedevi Antharjanam against dreams of others that they will get his wealth too by making their daughters getting married with him. Sreedevi Antherjanam had all good qualities but illiterate. Since literacy was a mandatory for Brahmins and even women were well versed in Sanskrit, being illiterate was a matter of humiliation and envious Brahmins never missed a chance to humiliate Antharjanam to which she never paid any attention. As the couple had no children even long after marriage, they started Ekadasi vrata for the same. The method adopted by Antharjanam for this was the most difficult one which made her to leave food and sleep also and she made her servant Sreedevi and her son Mukundan to follow the same. Since they were too wealthy Antherjanam started giving food to anyone at any time which only increased the wrath of orthodox Brahmins.

Humiliation of Antharjanam and miracle
As time passed, Bhattathiri died and Antherjanam was left all alone in the world. Since she regularly performed the Ekadasi vrata, she became a good devotee of Vishnu. However she was deeply troubled that she was unable to do ekadasi as she could not read panchangam(astrological calendar) and that others would humiliate her illiteracy if she were to ask them. But she somehow found an ekadasi day and to mark the days, she would keep a pebble in a pot each day so as to know when 15 days had passed. But many times the actual ekadasi day was either a day earlier or a day later than the one she thought due to the change in the appearance of the moon. This brought on more humiliation and people began associating all sorts of stubborn acts with her name. But one day, to everyone's shock, two astrologers confirmed the day to be ekadasi at Sankaramangalath Illam while it was dasami at every other place. Astonished by this incident, people understood and accepted the unconditional devotion of Antherjanam and started calling her “Sankaramangalathamma” or “Chankrothamma” with respect. This led the whole village to perform Ekadashi vrata on the same days Antharjanam did.

Troublesome Thukalasuran and Yakshi
After many years Mallikavanam was attacked by a dreadful Asura called Thukalasuran who looted every one and was fond of eating young human flesh. At the same time a yakshi (vampire) also reached western road to the village attacking everyone who come by that way. This made many to leave the place and outsiders to avoid the place. Being too aged, Antharjanam couldn't go anywhere. But it became very difficult to find a brahmachari (Brahmin boy who is under his deeksha after samavartanam) and thus doing paarana (final, most important event of ekadasi. Washing feet of brahmacharis and serving food to them) also became difficult. One day Antharjanam couldn't find any brahmachari and she cried in front of her idol of Vishnu requesting not to break her custom that she had been following from many years. By the time a young brahmachari reached there and asked food. Antharjanam became glad to see him and asked him to come after bath since she needed to complete rituals of Ekadasi. Discarding all warnings given by Antharjanam, the young man stepped towards the river where Thukalasuran lived. There happened a big fight between both. Finally the golden pole with the brahmachari turned into Sudarshana chakra and he killed Thukalasuran and his crew. After this, brahmachari washed his chakra in water and installed the Shivalinga worshipped by Thukalasuran on a hill top (Thukalassery). Reaching the northern entrance of the village, he conquered and tied hands of yakshi. After installing an idol of Durga on the rock with what he covered the well in which Yakshi was put, the Brahmachari requested Goddess Mahamaya to protect Mallikavanam from all other directions.

Installation of Sudarshana
Later the young man with five other brahmacharis reached Sankaramangalath illam. Antharjanam completed all rituals and served food to them in areca nut leaves as the rakshasa had destroyed all banana plantains. Goddess Lakshmi disguised as a housewife entered the scene and served thrippuli (a kind of pickle) to the brahmachari. Knowing Thukalasuran had been murdered by the brahmachari, people came there to visit him and requested show them his Chakra to salute. Brahmachari installed it in human form with eight hands facing west on the raised land east to them and advised for its daily worship. Sreedevi Antharjanam decided to build a temple there and asked Pathillathil Pottimar to be the administrators. The gathered people paid their oblations to the Chakra and prostrated in front of it. Then the brahmachari removed his uthareeyam (dress covering his chest) showing his chest adorned with Sreevatsam and goddess Lakshmi residing there, for Antharjanam to be confirmed that he was lord Vishnu only and on showing his Viswaroopam, Anthajanam, her servant and servant's son got salvation by merging with Him. This incident happened on 2998 BC and thereafter Mallikavanam became famous as Chakrapuram. Five brahmachari came along with the Lord were sage Durvasa and his desciples. The place where Thukalasuran lived is now known as Thukalassery, where he has been killed as Konnakkulangara, where brahmachari washed his Chakra as Chakrashaalana kadav, where he installed Durga's idol as Thiru Erankavu and three abodes of Mahamaya around the area as Aalumthuruthy, Karunaattukaavu and Padappaad. The Sankaramangalath illam is still well preserved outside the temple near to its western gate and is considered as the place of origin of the temple. Hence any custom followed in the temple starts here only. The place where the demon's head fell is called Talaiyaru, arms fell at Muttaru and legs at Kalaru. The place where the Chakra fell is called Chakarak Kaalvu.

Installation of Sreevallabhan’s idol
Around 3000 years after this incident, King Cheraman Perumal visited the temple and his wife Queen Cherumthevi expressed her wish to build a shrine for Vishnu also attached with it rebuilding the whole structure. They ordered a Vishnu's idol from Tamilakam after the temple construction. One night the Queen had a dream in which Garuda disguised as a Brahmin informed her about Sreevallabhan's idol and asked to install it there. With the help of Garuda and Tulu Brahmins, Cheraman Perumal brought the idol to Chakrapuram for installation. But during installation ceremony, the idol didn't fit to its peetham or seat, the priests felt something supernatural and everyone came out near Jalavannthy. Then they heard celestial instruments being played and chanting of vedic hymns from inside. As they rushed and opened altar door, they saw the idol installed at right place with blazing light everywhere and a couple of bananas in an Areca nut palm leaf in front of the idol. Two celestial beings came out of the sanctum-sanctorum and disappeared on eastern bank of Jalavanthy and they were Durvasa and Vedavyasa. Thereafter Chakrapuram had been renamed as Sreevallabhapuram. The idol that King ordered had been installed at Sree Krishna temple, Malayinkeezhu, Thiruvananthapuram. Sreevallabha temple had been built by Uliyannoor Perumthachan, the architectural legend. The temple wall and Garuda dhwaja were completed in a single day in 57 BC by the crew of the Lord. Perumthachan had made a panchaloha idol of Garuda which is currently seen over Garuda dhwajam. Soon after the installation, Garuda tried to fly and perumthachan stopped it by cutting its one wing by throwing his axe. The present copper flag is built there where Garuda had fallen during this incident.

Ban for women
After an incident of a woman getting salvation inside the shrine, ladies were more attracted to the temple. A series of inauspicious events happened after a lady who had been enchanted by beauty of the handsome idol entered the sanctum-sanctorum to marry the Lord and the administrators decided to ban women from entering the temple after an astrological counseling. But on request, they agreed to allow women twice a year during Thiruvathira of Dhanu month and Vishu in Medam when the Lord will be dressed up with mud, ashes, torn clothes etc. to look ugly. The ban was removed in 1968.

Vilwamangalam and Nammalvar
One early morning, Vilwamangalam Swamiyar visited the temple while Kathakali was being played outside. Swamiyar was astonished for not feeling the presence of the Lord inside. As he reached outer aanakkottil, he saw a young Brahmin watching kathakali and recognised him as none other than the Lord. Suddenly lord Sreevallabhan disappeared into the temple saying Swamiyar disturbed him while He was enjoying Kathakali, his favourite. Thereafter Kathakali became an important offering and is being played regularly in the temple. And too, to Nammalvar, Sreevallabhan appeared as Padmanabha sleeping in the ocean of milk, Sree Chakrapani, Infant Krishna showing all worlds in his mouth and Vamana who asked three feet land to King Mahabali.

Customs of worship
Vishnu at Sreevallabha Temple is being worshipped his cosmic, original and transcendental form Purusha which can be understood from (1) using different moola manthra/fundamental hymn for different aspects of Purusha contrary to the strict usage of only a single fundamental hymn in all temples, (2) sanctum-sanctorum is built in such a way that the top and bottom of the deity can't be seen as Viratpurusha has no origin and end, (3) Peetha pooja which is mandatory in all vaidika temples is not done here as Purusha is devoid of origin and end, (4) dressing up the deity only with white or saffron clothes contrary to popular yellow clothing used for Vishnu temples of vaidika sampradaya which suggests the eternity of Purusha and (5) the rituals and customs followed in the temple includes all Shaiva, Vaishnava and Shakteya worshipping that are now in practise in vaidika sampradaya because Purusha being the ultimate and others being only aspects of Purusha. Generally all kerala temples follow Vaidika School of worship based on the book Tantrasamuchayam. But Sreevallabha Temple doesn't follow Tantrasamuchayam and follows its own School called Pancharaathra Vidhaanam. No other temples are known to follow it but Thripunithura Sree Poornathrayeesa Temple follows a school of worship somewhat similar to that of Sreevallabha Temple. The temple has never changed its worship protocols since 59 BC and it is doubtful that any other temple follows such an ancient system.

Pancharaathra Vidhaanam
This should not be confused with Pancharatra Agama of Vaishnavites which is completely an Vaidika Āgama Sampradaya established whereas Pancharaathra Vidhanam is completely Vaidika Sampradaya of 4 BC origin. But base for both these is the same- five spontaneous aspects of Purusha – Param, Vyooham, Vibhavam, Antharyaami and Archa, but these have got entirely different explanations in Vedic tradition and Āgama tradition. Durvasa Samhitha based on Pancharaathra Vidhaanam by Sage Durvasa explains the rituals to be performed. The book Yajanavali, the nutshell of Durvasa Samhitha is being followed for worshipping lord Sreevallabhan and Ahirbudhnya Samhitha for Sudarshanamoorthy. Considering Srishti, Sthithi and Laya as the tejas of five aspects of Purusha, five pooja are performed here and the deity is adorned like Brahmachari, Grihastha and Sanyasi in different forms during these pooja. These customs are highly orthodox and can't be found anywhere else. The base of every temple is the energy driven through Moola mantra/fundamental hymn (of the respective God), which should never be changed/misused and strictly used during every pooja. If not, it changes the chaitanya or energy of the temple and is believed to produce disastrous effects to both temple and the place where it is situated, which need to be rectified by expensive and complicated penitential procedures. So no temples have multiple moola manthram where as Sreevallabha temple uses different moola manthram for different occasions. This is just an example to show how unique are the customs followed here and from basics, whole things are entirely different.

Poojas performed
Daily five main pooja are being performed with thee naivedyam and three sreebali. It starts with palliyunarthal or awakening the Lord followed by abhishekam or bathing with 12 pots of water sanctified with vedic chantings. This is followed by malar naivedyam. Afterwards Usha Pooja which is Purusha sukta pradhana starts. At this time, the idol will be dressed up like a brahmachari in 18 feet long white mundu with uthareeyam and two flower garlands. Then main nivedyam is done followed by usha deepaaradhana. First sreebali(sacrificing food to all crew of the deity) follows this. Pantheeradi pooja starts after a short interval in which the Lord is dressed up in Saffron-yellow mundu, angavastram, tulasi garland only. No ornaments are used during this as the Lord is assumed as a Yogeeshwara. This is also called as Purushanarayana pooja. Then follows Madhyahna/ ucha pooja or noon pooja in which Lord is assumed to be thriloka chakravarthi i.e. emperor of three worlds, grihastha bhava, adorned with all ornaments and garlands especially kesaadipaadam garlands. Ucha pooja is completed in three parts one inside sanctum-sanctorum, another one at navaka pooja and third being the paala namaskaaram. At this time ucha nivedyam and paala namaskaaram are done followed by sreebali and temple closes. Evening temple opens and deeparaadhana or lamp worship is done after sometime. Then follows the fourth pooja in which the Lord is assumed to be sreemad naarayanan and these two pooja are in Sthithi sankalpa. Soon athazha pooja/5th pooja is done in which Sreevallabhan is assumed to be Parabrahma, Yathi bhava, in Laya sankalpa. Now the Lord will be dressed up in a single saffron colour mundu and a tulasi garland only. After third sreebali, Lakshminarayana pooja is done as a part of the Sleeping ceremony and sanctum-sanctorum is closed keeping necessary articles for a pooja inside for Sage Durvasa along with Saptarishi who come at midnight daily for ardhayaama pooja. Sage Durvasa is believed to perform always naivedya also and hence prasanna pooja is open and naivedyam is done closed contrary to other kerala temple tradition. There were five Namboothiri Brahmin families and ten Tulu Brahmin families appointed as melsanthi or chief priests along with 180 keezhsanthi or sub-ordinate priests. Another 108 brahmacharins were also needed for daily paala namaskaaram. Thanthram (power of conducting temple rituals) is for three families viz. Thukalasseri Tharayil Kuzhikkattu, Thekkedathu Kuzhikkattu and Memena Kuzhikkattu families. Now only two melsanthi are there instead of 15. Any kind of pooja performed here should be done after doing a token worship or starting it at Sankaramangalath Illam as it is considered to be the moola sthaana (place of origin) of Sreevallabha temple.

Customs followed in the temple
Sreevallabha Temple is well known for its highly orthodox natured rare customs. In 1997, famous poet and former head-priest Vishnunarayanan Namboothiri was removed from the post as he had crossed the sea in order to address the Millennium Conference on Integration on Science and Consciousness, in Britain which resulted in religious sacrilege evoking the wrath of his own community since it was against temple customs. And only after a series of penance, he was allowed to continue in his post. The priests strictly should take bath in Jalavanthy before entering the temple and they shall never use sacred ash or vibhoothi, only sandal paste is to be used. The chief priest should be of 50 years old, married and should never be the one whose family has got hereditary rights for worshipping any Shiva temple. In every three years, priests can be changed. Also the priests entering Sreevallabhan’s shrine are restricted from entering even other shrines in the temple. There will be separate priests for that. Devotees also should never use sacred ash inside the temple wall. even though it is the prasada given. They shall use it outside only. Male devotees are not allowed to wear shirt, T-shirts etc. A detailed description of such customs can be found in the book Sreevallabha Mahakshethra Charithram by historian P.Unnikrishnan Nair.

Method of taking Darsanam
Four circumambulations or pradakshina are advised in the temple out of which one should be done outside and three inside the naalambalam. Enter through eastern gate, turn left and worship Ganapathy, Shiva and Ayyappan on the southern side. After circumambulating the jointly growing sacred fig and mango trees, proceed to Sankaramangalath Illam just outside the western gate. Return to temple and walk through the northern circumambulation path. Salute Kali at the northern gate and Kurayappa swamy too. Visit Jalavanthy and Salute Vedavyasa and Durvasa on its eastern bank. Turn right to Garuda dhwajam and worship Garuda before entering naalambalam. In naalambalam, worship Vadakkumthevar and Vishwak sena outside the sanctum and inside the sanctum Sreevallabhan, Lakshmi, Bhudevi, Varaha and Dakshinamurthy through eastern door and Sudarshana Chakra through western door.

Festivals and important days

There are two main festivals– thiru uthsavam and Uthra Sreebali. In Sreevallabha Temple Uthsavam is conducted giving importance to aaraattu(holy bath)and is for ten days ending with Pushya nakshatra of kumbham (February-march) of Malayalam calendar. Its customs and procedures are much complicated and start with kodiyett or raising the festival flag on the flagstaff. Two days before kodiyett, temple sanctifying procedures are performed. Then on the kodiyettu day, the holy flag is raised. Special poojas are done every day along with sreebhoothabali (sacrificing food to all crew of the deity) in the noon. On the seventh day night, pallivetta(custom done on the belief that the Lord hunts away all evil spirits) and tenth day the holy bath or aarattu. It is done at the river near Thukalassery and the deities of Sreevallabhan and Sudarshana moorthy are taken back to the temple after deepa aaradhana at Thukalassery Mahadeva Temple, accompanied by large and colourful procession and the temple is closed. Uthra Sreebali, the biggest festival of the temple, is conducted in the Malayalam month of Meenam(March–April). This is the festival of three Goddesses who had been asked by Sreevallabhan to protect Thiruvalla and it is conducted when they come to the Sreevallabha Temple to meet both the Lords. These goddesses are from the temples Aalumthuruthy, Padappattu and Karunaattu kaavu where temple festival starts on the same day in the month of Meenam. Before their holy bath on the eighth day the three goddesses proceed to Sreevallabha Temple where its northern gate is opened only at that time for them. The goddesses enter the temple through the northern gate and are welcomed by playing 18 groups of instruments and are directed towards the balikkalpura where the two Lords will be waiting to receive them. Then Ashtapadi is played and sreebali is done. This is followed by jeevatha dancing of the Goddesses in the middle of many lamps. Then the Goddesses proceed for their holy bath and the Goddess of Aalumthuruthy temple returns Sreevallabha Temple by next day noon Sreebali when lord Sreevallabhan gives her vishu kaineettam. As the sreebali ends, the programme gets over and the deities are taken back to respective temples. Taking part in the whole Uthra Sreebali is said to wash away sins of all births as all vedic and puranic deities are taking part in it. Other major fastivals as per Malayalam Calendar are on Thiruvonam of Chingam month, Thirunaal (chitra nakshatra) in Thulam month, Thirunaal chirappu (chitra nakshatra) in Vrischika month, Ardra of Dhanu month, Srebali during Makara Sankrama, Vishu in the month of Medam and Nira Puthari during Karkidakam.

Temple timings
Temple functions from morning 4 a.m. to noon and evening 5 p.m. to 8 p.m. Timings of major events are as follows. Morning 4.00 a.m. is Palli unarthal/awakening the deity. 04.30 a.m.= Nirmalya Darsanam/viewing the deity in the before day's gesture. 05.00 a.m.= Abhishekam/holy bath. 06.00 a.m= Malar nivedyam. 06.30 a.m.= First pooja or Usha pooja followed by Nivedyam. 08.00 a.m.= First Sreebali (procession outside). 09.00 a.m.= Pantheeradi pooja or fourth pooja. 10.45 a.m. = Ucha pooja or third pooja with Nivedyam. 11.30 a.m.= Ucha Sreebali. 12.00 p.m.= Temple closes
05.00 p.m. = Temple opens
06.30 p.m. = Deepa Araadhana
07.00 p.m. = Fourth pooja
07.30 p.m. = Athazha pooja or fifth pooja with Nivedyam
08.00 p.m. = Third Sreebali and temple closes

Offerings
The main four offerings are Paala Namaskaaram, Kathakali, Pantheerayiram and Kesadipaadam Garland. Paala Namaskaaram is actually a part of the third pooja around 10:45 am and is serving food with specific dishes to the Lord and Brahmins in areca nut palm leaves as Sreedevi Antharjanam served the same to the Lord. Before doing 108 Paala Namaskaaram daily was a ritual in the Temple and now due to scarcity of Brahmins it is reduced to only one, that too done by devotees as an offering. It needs to book for it at least a couple of years in advance to get the date. As told, Kathakali is daily played in the night as an offering and main stories played are Duryodhana Vadham(annihilation of Duryodhana), Santhana Gopalam(story of Arjuna), Kuchela Vrutham(story of Kuchela) Sreevallabha Vijayam(glory of Sreevallabhan) and Thokalaasura Vadham(annihilation of Thokalaasura). Santhana Gopalam is famous for getting children for those who don't have children, DuryodhanaVadham against enemies, Kuchela Vrutham to remove poverty and the two others to fulfil all wishes. Pantheerayiram is offering 12,001 bananas through a special ritual to the Lord as banana was the first offering to the deity soon after installation. It is a heavily expensive one and usually done at Pantheeradi Pooja. Kesaadipaadam garland is a flower garland measuring approximately 15 feet and the deity will be adorned with it during third and fourth pooja. And there are numerous other offerings which should be done during specific poojas only.

See also
 Temples of Kerala
 Pathanamthitta District
 Tiruvalla

References

External links

 Official website
 read in vaikhari
Vallavāḻ, the Abode of Viṣṇu: Formation and Transformation

 
Hindu temples in Pathanamthitta district
Vishnu temples
Thiruvalla
Mahavishnu temples in Kerala